Hauptmann Florian von der Mühle is an East German film. It was released in 1968.

Cast
 Manfred Krug: Florian
 Regina Beyer: Duchess Guastalla
 Rolf Herricht: Amadeus
 Gisela Bestehorn: Baroness Colloredo
 Jutta Klöppel: Fanny Schauendorf
 Hans Hardt-Hardtloff: Nepomuk
 Rolf Hoppe: police chief
 Peter Sturm: police chief (voice)
 Doris Abeßer: Nanderl
 Werner Lierck: adjutant
 Wolf Sabo: Metternich
 Carmen Maja Antoni: medic's assistant
 Peter Biele: 1. secretary
 Eberhard Cohrs: policeman

External links
 

1968 films
1968 adventure films
German adventure films
East German films
1960s German-language films
Films directed by Werner W. Wallroth
Films set in Vienna
Napoleonic Wars films
Cultural depictions of Klemens von Metternich
Films set in the Austrian Empire
1960s German films